Ribes californicum, with the common name hillside gooseberry, is a North American species of currant. It is endemic to California, where it can be found throughout many of the California Coast, Transverse, and Peninsular Ranges in local habitat types such as chaparral and woodlands.

Description

The inflorescence is a solitary flower or raceme of up to three flowers which hang pendent from the branches. The flower has five sepals in shades of deep red or green with a red tinge, which are reflexed upward. At the center is a tubular corolla of white or pinkish petals around five stamens and two longer styles.

The fruit is an edible red berry about a centimeter wide which is covered in stiff spines.

Varieties
Ribes californicum var. californicum - mostly Coast Ranges from Ventura County to Mendocino County, with additional populations in Orange County
Ribes californicum var. hesperium - primarily San Gabriel Mountains in  Southern California

References

External links
Jepson Manual Treatment - Ribes californicum
United States Department of Agriculture Plants Profile; Ribes californicum
Ribes californicum - Calphotos Photo gallery, University of California

californicum
Endemic flora of California
Natural history of the California chaparral and woodlands
Natural history of the California Coast Ranges
Natural history of the Peninsular Ranges
Natural history of the San Francisco Bay Area
Natural history of the Santa Monica Mountains
Natural history of the Transverse Ranges
Plants described in 1839
Garden plants of North America
Flora without expected TNC conservation status